Ptyodactylus hasselquistii, commonly known as the fan-footed gecko, Hasselquist's fan-footed gecko, and the yellow fan-fingered gecko, is a species of gecko, a lizard in the family Phyllodactylidae. The species is endemic to northern Africa and western Asia.

Etymology
The specific name, hasselquistii, is in honor of Swedish naturalist Fredrik Hasselquist.

Description

Geographic range
P. hasselquistii is found in Algeria, Cameroon, Egypt, Eritrea, eastern Ethiopia, Ghana, Iraq, Israel, Jordan, Lebanon, Libya, Morocco, Oman, Saudi Arabia (including the Farasan Islands), northern Somalia, Sudan, Syria, and Togo.

The type locality is Cairo, Egypt.

Reproduction
P. hasselquistii is oviparous.

Subspecies
Two subspecies are recognized as being valid, including the nominotypical subspecies.
Ptyodactylus hasselquistii hasselquistii 
Ptyodactylus hasselquistii krameri  – Kramer's yellow fan-fingered gecko

References

Further reading
Donndorff JA (1798). Amphibiologische und Ichthyologische Beyträge zur XIII. Ausgabe des Linneischen Natursysyems. Dritter Band [Volume 3]. Amphiben und Fische. Leipzig: Weidmannschen Buchhandlung. vi + 980 pp. (Lacerta hasselquistii, new species, p. 133). (in German and Latin).
Werner YL (1995). "Some unusual herpetological finds from Cyprus and Lebanon, including a new Ptyodactylus (Reptilia: Gekkonidae)". Biologia Gallo-Hellenica 22: 67–76. (Ptyodactylus hasselquistii krameri, new subspecies). (Fifth International Congress on Zoogeography and Ecology of Greece and Neighbouring Regions. Iraklion, Crete, Greece. April 16–20, 1990).

External links

Ptyodactylus
Reptiles described in 1798